Ženski košarkaški klub Jagodina 2001 is a former women's basketball team from Jagodina, Serbia. Home games were played at the JASSA Sports Center.

History
ŽKK Jagodina 2001 was established on 25 November 2001 with only junior categories. In 2009 they managed to qualify to the Second League of Serbia, and in 2011 for the First League of Serbia. 2014 the club relegated from the First League and after that, the club ceased to exist.

Arena

JASSA Sport Center is an indoor multi-purpose sports arena in Jagodina, Serbia. The hall was opened in 1978 as Sports Hall Mladost. The current name JASSA is actually an abbreviation of Jagodina Sports Association, which manages the hall. The hall has two stands of 1,300 seats, so that the total capacity is 2,600 seats.

The hall area is 5500 m2, while the field size is 40x20 meters. Accompanying the sports facilities there are also a small hall with a 20x12 meter field, and a bowling, gym and judo hall with dimensions of 15x8 meters. The hall is still a restaurant, bar, small and large hall for celebrations and office space for several clubs. Parking in front of the hall has space for 1,000 vehicles.

Notable former players

Notable former coaches
Slađan Ivić

See also
 KK Jagodina

References

External links
 Profile on facebook.com
 Profile on eurobasket.com
 Profile on srbijasport.net

Jagodina 2001
Sport in Jagodina
Basketball teams established in 2001
Defunct basketball teams in Serbia